Wandee Kameaim (born January 18, 1978, in Ban Pong) is a Thai weightlifter.

At the 2002 World Championships she won the silver medal in the 58 kg category, with 212.5 kg in total.

She competed in the women's 58 kg at the 2004 Summer Olympics and won the bronze medal with 230.0 kg in total.

Kameaim competed in the Women's 58 kg at the 2005 World Championships in Doha, Qatar and won the silver medal with 236.0 kg in total. For a short time she held the World Record in clean and jerk with 135 kg, but lost it in the same event to Gu Wei who lifted 136 kg, and then 139 kg. A year later she stuck at 230.0 kg at the 2006 World Weightlifting Championships and took the bronze medal.

At the 2008 Summer Olympics she ranked 4th in the 58 kg category.

Notes and references

External links
 Athlete Biography at beijing2008

1978 births
Living people
Wandee Kameaim
Weightlifters at the 2004 Summer Olympics
Weightlifters at the 2008 Summer Olympics
Wandee Kameaim
Wandee Kameaim
World record setters in weightlifting
Olympic medalists in weightlifting
Asian Games medalists in weightlifting
Weightlifters at the 2002 Asian Games
Weightlifters at the 2006 Asian Games
Weightlifters at the 2010 Asian Games
Medalists at the 2004 Summer Olympics
Wandee Kameaim
Medalists at the 2002 Asian Games
Medalists at the 2006 Asian Games
Wandee Kameaim
Southeast Asian Games medalists in weightlifting
Competitors at the 2005 Southeast Asian Games
World Weightlifting Championships medalists
Wandee Kameaim
Wandee Kameaim